John Michael Montgomery (born January 20, 1965) is an American country music singer. Montgomery began singing with his brother Eddie, who would later become known as one half of the duo Montgomery Gentry, before beginning his major-label solo career in 1992. He has had more than 30 singles on the Billboard country charts, of which seven have reached number one: "I Love the Way You Love Me", "I Swear", "Be My Baby Tonight", "If You've Got Love", "I Can Love You Like That", "Sold (The Grundy County Auction Incident)", and "The Little Girl". 13 more have reached the top 10. "I Swear" and "Sold (The Grundy County Auction Incident)" were named by Billboard as the top country songs of 1994 and 1995, respectively. Montgomery's recordings of "I Swear" and "I Can Love You Like That" were both released concurrently with cover versions by the R&B group All-4-One. Several of Montgomery's singles crossed over to the Billboard Hot 100, his highest peak there having been achieved by "Letters from Home" in 2004.

Montgomery has released 10 studio albums. His first seven albums were released via Atlantic Records Nashville, and his next two via parent company Warner Bros. Records Nashville after Atlantic closed its country division in 2001. His first three albums, Life's a Dance (1992), Kickin' It Up (1994), and John Michael Montgomery (1995) are all certified multi-platinum by the Recording Industry Association of America (RIAA); 1996's What I Do the Best is certified platinum; while Leave a Mark (1998) and Brand New Me (2000) are certified gold.

Biography
John Michael Montgomery was born in Danville, Kentucky, on January 20, 1965, to parents Carol Dean (née Lay) and Harold Edward Montgomery (1941-1994). He was raised in Nicholasville, Kentucky. Montgomery received musical encouragement from his father, who played in a local country band and taught him his first chords. John Michael joined the family band (which included his older brother, Eddie Montgomery, who with Troy Gentry would form the duo Montgomery Gentry), playing guitar before becoming lead singer when his parents divorced. Later, he performed as a solo artist playing "working man's country." Atlantic Records spotted him and signed him.

Musical career

Life's a Dance
In 1992, Montgomery's debut album, Life's a Dance, produced his chart debut in its title track, which peaked at number 4 on the Hot Country Songs charts. It was followed by his first number 1 hit, "I Love the Way You Love Me", which also crossed over to the Billboard Hot 100 with a peak of number 60. The album's last single was "Beer and Bones", with a number 21 country peak. "I Love the Way You Love Me" was named Song of the Year by the Academy of Country Music, and John Michael was also awarded the Top New Male Vocalist award also by the ACM Awards in 1994, beating Doug Supernaw and Clay Walker. Life's a Dance earned a triple-platinum Recording Industry Association of America (RIAA) certification for shipments of three million copies. He appeared on the PBS music program Austin City Limits in 1994 during Season 19.

Kickin' It Up
Montgomery's second album was 1994's Kickin' It Up. This album was led off by the No. 1 country and No. 42 pop hit "I Swear", which was also the top country song of 1994 according to Billboard Year-End. After this song came the No. 4 "Rope the Moon", and two more No. 1 singles in "Be My Baby Tonight" and "If You've Got Love". "I Swear" gained further success a year later, when it was covered by pop group All-4-One. Kickin' It Up also sold even higher than his debut, earning a quadruple platinum certification for shipments of four million copies.

John Michael Montgomery
In 1995, he released his self-titled third studio album. Also a quadruple-platinum seller, it accounted for five hit singles, including the Number One hits "I Can Love You Like That" and "Sold (The Grundy County Auction Incident)". Like "I Swear" before it, the former was covered by All-4-One, while the latter was also declared the Number One country hit of 1995 on the Billboard Year-End charts. After this pair of Number One hits came the No. 3 "No Man's Land", then two consecutive No. 4 singles in "Cowboy Love" and "Long as I Live." Also included on the album was "Holdin' Onto Somethin'", which was a top 10 country hit in early 1996 for Jeff Carson. At the end of 1995, Montgomery placed his career on hiatus due to a vocal cord injury.

What I Do the Best
What I Do the Best was his fourth studio album, released by Atlantic in 1996. This was the first album of his career not to produce a No. 1 country hit. It also failed to match the sales of its predecessors, although it still earned platinum certification. This album was led off by the No. 15 "Ain't Got Nothin' On Us", which despite debuting in the Top 40 its first week on the charts, also became his first single since 1993's "Beer and Bones" to miss Top Ten. He regained his chart momentum with three more Top Ten hits off the same album: "Friends" at No. 2, "I Miss You a Little" at No. 6 and "How Was I to Know" also at No. 2. After this album, he released a Greatest Hits album in 1997, which reprised his greatest hits to that point and went platinum in the United States. It also included the new song "Angel in My Eyes", which was a No. 4 single for him that year. Also in 1997, Montgomery sang guest vocals on "Warning Signs", a No. 56-peaking musical track which included snippets from a Bill Engvall comedy sketch.

Leave a Mark
In 1998, Montgomery released his fifth album, Leave a Mark. This album contained a more pop-oriented sound than his previous work. Despite only earning a gold certification from the RIAA, it accounted for three more hit singles. First was "Love Working on You" at No. 14, followed by "Cover You in Kisses" at No. 3 and "Hold On to Me" at No. 4. Despite having several of his singles cross over to the pop charts, "Hold On to Me" was his first Top 40 pop hit, reaching No. 33 on the Hot 100.

Home to You
Home to You, his sixth album, continued to move Montgomery toward a mature audience, and continued his declining album sales. It produced a No. 15 in "Hello L.O.V.E." and a No. 2 in its title track, although the next two singles — "Nothing Catches Jesus by Surprise" and "You Are" — both fell short of Top 40, with the former being his first single to do so.

Brand New Me
Montgomery returned to the top of the country charts for the first time since 1995 with "The Little Girl". This song, featuring backing vocals from Alison Krauss and inspired by an urban legend, was the first single from his 2000 album Brand New Me, spending three weeks at Number One and reaching No. 35 on the Hot 100. Despite the success of this song, however, Montgomery again found his chart success declining after "The Little Girl", as the album's other two singles — "That's What I Like About You" and "Even Then" — both failed to reach Top 40, although Brand New Me earned a gold certification. By the end of the year, Montgomery was also moved from Atlantic to parent label Warner Bros. Records after Atlantic closed its Nashville branch.

Pictures
His first release for Warner Bros. was 2002's Pictures. This album saw minimal success in its chart singles, with lead-off "Til Nothing Comes Between Us" reaching No. 19 and the next two singles ("Country Thang" and "Four Wheel Drive") once again missing Top 40. The album was followed a year later by Mr. Snowman, a Christmas album, in 2003, as well as a compilation entitled The Very Best of John Michael Montgomery

Letters from Home
Montgomery's last Warner Bros. release was 2004's Letters from Home. Although the lead-off single, "Cool" failed to chart, the first single of Montgomery's career not to chart, the title track became his biggest crossover hit with a No. 2 country and No. 24 pop peak. Despite the success of this single, the album's third and final release, "Goes Good with Beer", peaked at No. 51, and after its release, Montgomery exited his label.

After an off-key performance of the National Anthem at the televised NASCAR event, Golden Corral 500, on March 20, 2005, Montgomery confirmed on his website that he had a condition known as acoustic neuroma, which is a non-cancerous growth that interferes with a nerve running between the brain and the ear.  This condition can affect balance and hearing. The problem was corrected, and did not alter Montgomery's touring schedule for the rest of 2005.

At 2:20 a.m. on February 16, 2006, Montgomery was arrested at an intersection in Lexington, Kentucky, for driving under the influence and possession of a controlled substance, which was identified as Endocet by the Lexington Herald-Leader. Police also found two loaded handguns in Montgomery's vehicle.  Montgomery was charged with a count of a prescription drug not in its proper container, two counts of carrying a concealed deadly weapon, disregarding a traffic control device and performing an improper turn.

Montgomery's lawyer, Jon Woodall, has stated that Montgomery is a hunter, and holds a concealed weapon permit, though Montgomery did not have the license with him at the time of arrest. Woodall also stated that the prescription was filled by Montgomery's physicians after Montgomery's recent hip replacement surgery. He has since been found not guilty of all charges.  Montgomery pleaded no-contest to the charge of DUI, stating that he did not admit guilt, but the state had enough evidence to convict him.

On May 9, 2008, Montgomery announced that he was in rehab for an undisclosed substance abuse problem; he sought rehab at a drug-treatment facility in Hazard, KY. His condition was cited as severe anxiety attacks and a sleep disorder.

Time Flies
In late 2008, Montgomery founded his own label, Stringtown Records. That year, he released his next album, Time Flies. This album produced three singles: "Mad Cowboy Disease", "If You Ever Went Away", and "Forever." Although the first two both failed to chart, "Forever" peaked at No. 28 on the country charts, representing his first chart entry in over four years.  Mad Cowboy Disease reached No. 17 on Mediabase's Satellite Radio chart.  He also sang duet vocals on the title track to Colt Ford's debut album Ride Through the Country.

Personal life
Montgomery married Crystal White on January 8, 1996; the couple has two children.

In September 2022, Montgomery's tour bus overturned in an accident outside Jellico, Tennessee. Montgomery suffered broken ribs, and several passengers were injured as well.

Discography

Studio albums
 Life's a Dance (1992)
 Kickin' It Up (1994)
 John Michael Montgomery (1995) 
 What I Do the Best (1996)
 Leave a Mark (1998)
 Home to You (1999)
 Brand New Me (2000)
 Pictures (2002)
 Letters from Home (2004)
 Time Flies (2008)

Awards & Nominations

Awards
Country Music Association
 1994 Horizon Award
 1994 Single of the Year - "I Swear"

Academy of Country Music
 1993 Top New Male Vocalist
 1993 Song of the Year - "I Love the Way You Love Me" written by Chuck Cannon and Victoria Shaw
 1994 Single Record of the Year - "I Swear"
 1994 Song of the Year - "I Swear" written by Gary Baker and Frank J. Myers

American Music Awards
 1993 Favorite Country New Artist

TNN/Music City News Awards
 1993 Star of Tomorrow

Nominations
Country Music Association
 1993 Horizon Award
 1995 Album of the Year - "John Michael Montgomery"
 1995 Male Vocalist of the Year

Academy of Country Music
 1995 Top Video of the Year - "Sold (The Grundy County Auction Incident)"
 1999 Single of the Year - "The Little Girl"
 1999 Song of the Year - "The Little Girl" written by Harley Allen

Grammy Awards
 1994 Best Male Country Vocal Performance - "I Swear"
 1995 Best Male Country Vocal Performance - "I Can Love You Like That"
 1995 Best Country Album - "John Michael Montgomery"

American Music Awards
 1994 Favorite Country Single - "I Swear"

References

External links

Official website

1965 births
American country singer-songwriters
American male singer-songwriters
Country musicians from Kentucky
Living people
People from Garrard County, Kentucky
Atlantic Records artists
Warner Records artists
Singer-songwriters from Kentucky